The 1989 Hamilton Tiger-Cats season was the 32nd season for the team in the Canadian Football League and their 40th overall. The Tiger-Cats finished in 1st place in the East Division with a 12–6 record and played in the 77th Grey Cup game. The team lost the highest scoring Grey Cup game in the trophy's history to the Saskatchewan Roughriders by a score of 43–40. Tony Champion set a franchise record for most touchdowns in one season with 15 and was the team's nominee for Most Outstanding Player. Paul Osbaldiston nearly matched his franchise record for most converts in a single season. Osbaldiston had 47 converts, two fewer than he scored in 1988.

Offseason

CFL Draft

Preseason

Regular season

Season standings

Season schedule

Postseason

Schedule

Grey Cup

Awards and honours
Jerry Keeling was elected into the Canadian Football Hall of Fame as a Player on June 3, 1989.
CFL's Most Outstanding Canadian Award – Rocky DiPietro (SB)
CFL's Most Outstanding Rookie Award – Stephen Jordan (DB)

1989 CFL All-Stars
Tony Champion, Wide Receiver
Rocky DiPietro, Slotback
Miles Gorrell, Offensive Tackle
Jason Riley, Offensive Guard

References

Hamilton Tiger-Cats seasons
James S. Dixon Trophy championship seasons
1989 Canadian Football League season by team